Meglumine is a sugar alcohol derived from glucose that contains an  amino group modification.  It is often used as an excipient in pharmaceuticals and in conjunction with iodinated compounds in contrast media such as diatrizoate meglumine,  iothalamate meglumine and iodipamide meglumine.

See also
 Flunixin meglumine
 Meglumine antimoniate

References

Hexosamines